Sooraj Santhosh (born 19 September 1987) is an Indian playback singer who sings mainly in Telugu, Tamil and Malayalam languages and has also sung in Hindi, Kannada and Badaga. He has sung around 200 songs in 8 Indian languages. He was the former lead vocalist of the band Masala Coffee.

Personal life
Sooraj Santhosh was born in Paravur in Kollam and then moved to Trivandrum. He attended Government Model Boys Higher Secondary School, Thiruvananthapuram for schooling. He pursued his B.Com. at MG College and his M.Com. at Mar Ivanious College.

Singing career
He won the 2004 School Youth Festival and 2004–2005 Kerala State Higher Secondary Youth Festival. He represented Kerala University in the South Zone Inter-University Youth Festival and was declared the winner three years in a row – 2009, 2010 and 2011, and participated in the National Inter University Youth Festival. 
In 2009 he shifted his base from Trivandrum to Chennai.
He says that if it was not for his guru, professional flautist and Carnatic musician Kudamaloor Janardanan, he wouldn't have understood music in this depth. Sooraj accompanied Kudamaloor Janardhanan for a fusion ensemble at the Kovalam Lit Fest (2010) (he was the only singer in the group).
He is also a vocalist with Ashram Oriental Rock, a seven-member Indo-Austrian band, and went on a European tour with them in 2011.

Masala Coffee 
Sooraj Santhosh was the co-founder and former lead vocalist of Masala Coffee, which made its debut on Kappa TV's Music Mojo. The band composed the soundtrack for the Tamil movie, Uriyadi, co-produced by Nalan Kumarasamy.  They composed the title track and featured in a promo video for the Malayalam movie, Hello Namasthe. Masala Coffee performed at the RAAG 'N' ROCK Indie Music Festival at Al Nasr Leisureland, Dubai, on September 11, 2015, releasing their first music video titled 'Aalayaal Tharam Venam', in 2016. In November 2019, Masala Coffee announced that they were cordially parting ways with Sooraj, so the latter could pursue a promising solo music career. Sooraj made his independent band latter which came to know as Sooraj Santhosh Live 

His first song ′Inka Etho′ composed by G.V Prakash for the Telugu Darling won him the Mirchi Music Awards South conducted by Radio Mirchi for the Best Upcoming Singer in Telugu (2010). "A Special program on the Mirchi Music Awards hosted to felicitate all the singers and musicians of South India" 
Sooraj made his debut in Malayalam with the song ′Ee Ramayanakkootil′ in the film Second Show. Music was composed by Nikhil Rajan starring Dulquar Salman.

Sooraj made his entry into the Tamil film industry by singing ′Uyirin Suvaril′ and ′Vegam vegam′ in the movie Sridhar (2012)for which music was composed by Rahul Raj. He got his break with a duet song ′Yamma Yamma′ in All in All Azhagu Raja (2013) with Shreya Ghoshal, music composed by S. Thaman. ′Othakadai othakadai′ and ′Yaelley Yaelley′ from the film Pandiya Naadu (2013) composed by D. Imman are other Tamil songs. His recent song ′Madai Thirandhathu′ was for music director M M Sreelekha in the film Kaadhal Solla Aasai.

He has been nominated in the category of Best Upcoming Vocalist (Male)in Malayalam (2013) by Music Mirchi Awards, for his rendition of the song 'Iniyum Nin Mounam' for the movie KQ.

He won the Kerala State Film Award for Best Male Playback Singer for the song "Thaniye Mizhikal" from the film Guppy. He also won the Janbhumi film awards 2017 and SIIMA 2017.

The Gypsy Sun

Sooraj is working on his debut solo album, which is a Multilingual album consists of 6 songs, Recently he released one among the 6 songs. ‘Thani Malayalam’ released recently has wooed the audience with its unique theme and offbeat composition. The song's genesis is rooted in Sooraj's love for language. The Music Video features eminent personalities from Malayalam literature, culture, art and cinema like M T Vasudevan Nair, Sara Joseph, Benyamin, Nedumudi Venu, Peeshapilly Rajeevan, Artist Bhattathiri, Methil Devika, Peruvanam Kuttan Marar, Ramachandra Pulavar.

Solo album 

The Gypsy Sun

Sooraj is working on his debut solo album, which is a multilingual album consists of 6 songs, Recently he released one among them. ‘Thani Malayalam’ which has wooed the audience with its unique theme and offbeat composition. The song's genesis is rooted in Sooraj's love for language. The Music Video features eminent personalities from Malayalam literature, culture, art and cinema like M T Vasudevan Nair, Sara Joseph, Benyamin, Nedumudi Venu, Peeshapilly Rajeevan, Artist Bhattathiri, Methil Devika, Peruvanam Kuttan Marar, Ramachandra Pulavar.

Discography

Malayalam

Tamil

Telugu

Hindi

Kannada

Music albums

Awards 

Kerala State Film Awards

2016: Best Male Playback Singer - 'Thaniye Mizhikal', Guppy

Other Awards

2010: Mirchi Music Awards South, Best Upcoming Singer (Telugu) - 'Inka Etho', Darling

2017: Janmabhumi Film Awards, Best Playback Singer - 'Thaniye Mizhikal', Guppy

2017: SIIMA, Best Playback Singer (Malayalam)- 'Thaniye Mizhikal', Guppy
2018: Mirchi Music Awards South, Mirchi Music Awards South#Best vocalists Malayalam

International concerts

 US-Canada tour with Music director Devi Sri Prasad for a series of performances in cities across USA and Canada (July–August 2014) - 'Team for US Tour'
 Sooraj performed with the band Masala Coffee in Dubai on 17 October 2014 at the inaugural ceremony of KPL Dubai Season 3.
 Sooraj and his band, Masala Coffee will be performing live for Raag 'N' Rock - The Indie Music Festival, on 11 September 2015 in Dubai
 Sooraj is the Soloist Tenor who will be accompanying the Chennai-based composer Mr. Ganesh B. Kumar and team to premiere the Shanmuga Kavacham with the European Choir Group. It is the world's first Choral composition from India, to adorn the Western Classical Choral repertoire. This composition titled “Shanmuga Kavacham” is a spiritual masterpiece in Tamil, written by the Saint / Poet Srimath Pamban Swamigal, in 1891. The World Premiere of “Shanmuga Kavacham”, along with other selected mantras would be performed in Choral a cappella style in Germany on 20 September 2015 at Kurhaus Weisbaden / Friedrich-von-Thiersch-Saal, Germany. This auspicious event is titled “Mantra Meets Classic” and will be conducted by Mr. Nicol Matt,  one of Germany's few new generation conductors enjoying international reputation.
 Sooraj has accompanied Gopi Sunder to perform in Melbourne at 1330, Ferntree Gully Rd, Scoresby, VIC 3179 for the audio launch of the movie 'Team 5' on 1 October 2016.
 Sooraj has performed with Masala Coffee on 22 October 2016, at the Malaysian Independent Live Fusion Festival held at the StarXpo Centre, Kuala Lumpur.
 Sooraj and his band, Masala Coffee Performed for the Sarvesh Festival of Arts at the Victoria Hall, Singapore, on 25 November 2016.
 Sooraj has performed with his band Masala Coffee on 17 March 2017, at the Dubai Global Village.

References

Further reading

 
 – An article in The Hindu dated 26 October 2013
 – Pandianadu songs review.
 – music review of Pandianadu.
 – music review of Kadhal Solla Aasai
 – "Feature on the audio launch of the movie Kadhal Solla Aasai".
 – 'Parayathe' album description – Devathe en Nenjile song by Sooraj Santhosh.
 - 'Devi Sri Prasad gears up for concerts in US, Canada' - Suraj Santhosh in the team with Devi Sri Prasad
 - Suraj, singer, mollywood in Varthaprabhatham - Interview of Sooraj Santhosh on Asianet TV.
 - Kadavul Paathi Mirugam Paathi – Music Review (Tamil Movie Soundtrack)
 - Power Telugu Movie Audio Launch - Part 8 - Live performance of Sooraj Santhosh and Malavika (Power - Telugu movie audio launch)
 - Snehithane - Masala Coffee - Music Mojo - Promo - Kappa TV
 -   New music album - London Love - Song - Azhake Ninave 
 - New music album - Namma Ooru Song - Kaatrey Maasai
 - Mojo Rising music fest, organised by Kappa TV in Kochi (20th Feb, 2015) 
 - An article in The Deccan Chronicle dated 31 May 2015.
 - Live performance of Rama Rama song at Srimanthudu audio release function - Shilpa Kala Vedhika, Hyderabad on July 18, 2015.
 - Mantra meets Classic - "Shanmuga Kavacham" - Sooraj Santhosh - Male Solo Tenor from India.
 - Translated (German to English) Article about the Mantra meets Classic concert in Germany dt Sept 22, 2015.
 

Indian male playback singers
Singers from Kollam
Musicians from Kollam
Singers from Kerala
1987 births
Living people
Film musicians from Kerala
21st-century Indian singers
Malayalam playback singers
Telugu playback singers
Kannada playback singers
Tamil playback singers
21st-century Indian male singers